Major General Masoud Monfared Niyaki or Monfared Niaki (1929–1985) was a commander in Islamic Republic of Iran Army. He studied in the Officers' School, specializing in armored warfare. Niyaki got the rank of colonel in 1976. He was active during the Iran–Iraq war, including Operation Tariq al-Qods, Operation Fath ol-Mobin, Operation Beit ol-Moqaddas, Operation Valfajr, and Operation Ramazan. He was commander of the 92nd Armored Division of Ahvaz and 88th Armored Division of Zahedan.
He was killed during a war game conducted by 58th Zolfaghar Takavar Division.

In popular culture
Footstep of the Oldman, written by Alireza Poorbozorg in 170 pages, is a biography of Massoud Monfared Niyaki.

The Last Chapter of Love was a documentary film about Monfared Niyaki broadcast by IRIB 3.

References

External link

1929 births
1985 deaths
Islamic Republic of Iran Army personnel of the Iran–Iraq War
Islamic Republic of Iran Army colonels
Accidental deaths in Iran
Recipients of the Order of Fath
People from Amol
Military personnel killed by friendly fire